The San Joaquin Valley League was a minor league baseball league that operated from 1910 through 1911.  The league operated primarily in the San Joaquin Valley in California. The league disbanded on July 18, 1911. The Bakersfield Drillers and Tulare Merchants won league championships.

Cities represented 
Bakersfield, CA: Bakersfield Drillers 1910 
Coalinga, CA: Coalinga Savages 1910; Coalinga Tigers 1911 
Hanford, CA: Hanford Braves 1911 
Lemoore, CA: Lemoore Cubs 1911 
Porterville, CA: Porterville Orange Pickers 1911 
Tulare, CA: Tulare Merchants 1910–1911 
Visalia, CA: Visalia Pirates 1910; Visalia Colts 1911

Standings & statistics

1910 San Joaquin Valley League
 Tulare disbanded August 8; Coalinga disbanded August 18. The league officially disbanded September 12.

1911 San Joaquin Valley League 
 Tulare and Porterville disbanded July 11. The league officially disbanded July 18.

References 
 McCann, M. (n.d.). Minor League Baseball History. Retrieved April 27, 2007, from https://www.webcitation.org/query?url=http://www.geocities.com/big_bunko/sanjoaquinvalley1011.htm&date=2009-10-25+13:34:04

Defunct minor baseball leagues in the United States
Baseball leagues in California
Sports leagues established in 1910
Sports leagues disestablished in 1911